Black Monday is the third album by Detroit rapper Dice. The album contains a diss track aimed at Esham, "Kkkill the Fetus". The album sold 8,000 units.

Track listing

References

External links 

 Black Monday on Allmusic
 Black Monday on Discogs

2000 albums
Dice (rapper) albums